Lords may refer to:

 The plural of Lord

Places 

Lords Creek, a stream in New Hanover County, North Carolina
Lord's, English Cricket Ground and home of Marylebone Cricket Club and Middlesex County Cricket Club

People 

Traci Lords (born 1968), American actress

Politics 
House of Lords, upper house of the British parliament
Lords Spiritual, clergymen of the House of Lords
Lords Temporal, secular members of the House of Lords
Trịnh Lords, Vietnamese rulers (1553-1789)

Other 
Lords Feoffees, English charitable trust
Lords of Acid, electronic band
Lords Hoese, English noble house
Lords of the Realm, Lords of the Realm II, and Lords of the Realm III, a series of video games
"Lords", a song by the Sword from the album Gods of the Earth

See also 

 Lord (disambiguation)
 House of Lords (disambiguation)